Vaida may refer to:

Places 
 Vaida, Estonia, a borough in northern Estonia
 Vaida Bay, a bay in the far northwest of Russia
 Vayda-Guba, a rural locality in Murmansk Oblast, Russia
 Vaida, a village in the commune of Roșiori, Bihor, Romania
 Vaida-Cămăraș, a village in Căianu Commune, Cluj County, Romania

People 
 Alexandru Vaida-Voevod (1872-1950), Romanian politician 
 Veronica Vaida (born 1950), Romanian-American chemist
 Vaida Pikauskaitė (born 1991), Lithuanian cyclist
 Vaida Žūsinaitė (born 1988), Lithuanian runner
 Vaida Žitinevičiūtė, Lithuanian gymnast; see 2015 World Artistic Gymnastics Championships – Women's qualification
 Vaida Sipavičiūtė (born 1985), Lithuanian basketball player

See also
 
 Vaidas, a Lithuanian given name
 Vajda, a Hungarian surname
 Vayda, a surname
 Wajda (surname), a Polish surname
 Wayda, a Bollywood film

Lithuanian feminine given names
Romanian-language surnames